'Powder Puff' is a hybrid succulent plant from the Pachyphytum cross Echeveria genus, × Pachyveria. 'Powder Puff' is derived from Echeveria cante and Pachyphytum oviferum. It was created in the 1970s.

References

Hybrid plants
Succulent plants
Crassulaceae
Intergeneric hybrids